Robert Hirst (born August 10, 1971 in Road Town, Tortola, British Virgin Islands) is a sailor who competed in the Summer Olympics for the British Virgin Islands.

In his first Olympics, Hirst was a crew member of the Soling team that competed at the 1992 Summer Olympics where they finished 17th out of 24 teams, four years later at the 1996 Summer Olympics he entered the laser class where finished 25th out of 56 starters.

References

Olympic sailors of the British Virgin Islands
British Virgin Islands male sailors (sport)
Sailors at the 1992 Summer Olympics – Soling
Sailors at the 1996 Summer Olympics – Laser
Living people
1971 births